Endville (also, Enville) is an unincorporated community in Pontotoc County, Mississippi, United States.

On April 27, 2011, a tornado hit Endville as part of the 2011 Super Outbreak.

References

Unincorporated communities in Pontotoc County, Mississippi
Unincorporated communities in Mississippi